Anatoly Pavlovich Artsebarsky (born 9 September 1956) is a former Soviet cosmonaut.

He became a cosmonaut in 1985. Artsebarsky spent almost five months in space on a single spaceflight. In 1991, he flew aboard Soyuz TM-12 and docked with the Mir Space Station. Artsebarsky and Sergei Krikalev stayed aboard Mir while the rest of the crew flew back to Earth after eight days. Artsebarsky took six spacewalks during the Mir EO-9 mission. He spent over 33 hours walking in space.

During his stay, Artsebarsky constructed a space tower for use with a control module. Artsebarsky and Krikalev were almost stuck at the station. They were in orbit during the Soviet coup attempt of 1991. For several days, the political situation seriously jeopardised their position.

Awards 
 Hero of the Soviet Union
 Pilot-Cosmonaut of the USSR
 Order of Lenin
 Medal "For Merit in Space Exploration"

In media
 Artsebarsky is mentioned in the 2013 movie Gravity, because fictional astronaut Matt Kowalski hopes to break Artsebarsky's spacewalking record.
 He visited Tehran's Sharif University together with cosmonaut Talgat Musabayev on October 7, 2019.

References

1956 births
Living people
People from Dnipropetrovsk Oblast
Heroes of the Soviet Union
Soviet Air Force officers
Soviet cosmonauts
Recipients of the Medal "For Merit in Space Exploration"
Spacewalkers
Mir crew members